The Play-offs of the 2004 Fed Cup Americas Zone Group I were the final stages of the Group I Zonal Competition involving teams from the Americas. Using the positions determined in their pools, the seven teams faced off to determine their placing in the 2004 Fed Cup Americas Zone Group II. The top two teams advanced to Group II for the next year.

Promotion play-offs
The first and second placed teams of each pool were placed against each other in two head-to-head rounds. The winner of the rounds advanced to Group II for 2005.

Paraguay vs. Venezuela

Jamaica vs. Bolivia

Fifth
As there was only three teams from Pool B as opposed to the four from Pool A, the third-placed team from Pool A had no equivalent to play against. Thus the Ecuadorians were automatically allocated fifth place.

6th to 7th play-offs
The last-placed teams from each pool were drawn in head-to-head rounds to find the sixth and seventh placed teams.

Guatemala vs. Dominican Republic

Final Placements

  and  advanced to 2005 Fed Cup Americas Zone Group I. However, they both placed equal last and thus were relegated back to Group II for 2006.

See also
Fed Cup structure

References

External links
 Fed Cup website

2004 Fed Cup Americas Zone